Mondino is an Italian surname. Notable people with the surname include:

 Eduardo Mondino (born 1958), Argentine politician
 Jean-Baptiste Mondino (born 1949), French photographer
 Mahaut Mondino, French singer
 Mondino de Luzzi, Italian physician, anatomist and professor of surgery

See also
 Mondini